Gobicyon is an extinct genus of bear dogs (members of the family Amphicyonidae) endemic to Central Asia during the Late Miocene 13.6—11.6 Ma, existing for approximately . Fossils have been discovered only at Tong Xin in Central China.

Sources

Miocene mammals of Asia
Miocene carnivorans
Bear dogs
Prehistoric carnivoran genera